Untitled Goose Game is a 2019 puzzle stealth game developed by House House and published by Panic Inc. Players control a goose who bothers the inhabitants of an English village. The player must use the goose's abilities to manipulate objects and non-player characters to complete objectives. It was released for macOS, Nintendo Switch, Windows, PlayStation 4, and Xbox One.

The idea for Untitled Goose Game originated from a stock photograph of a goose that a House House employee posted in the company's internal communications. This sparked a conversation about geese; the team put the idea aside for a few months until they realised that it had the potential to be a fun game. Inspired by Super Mario 64, and the Hitman series, House House worked on combining stealth mechanics with a lack of violence to create humorous in-game scenarios. The game's unusual name came from a last-minute decision in preparing the title as an entry for a games festival, and it stuck. The music, designed by composer Dan Golding, uses short clips from Debussy's 12th prelude from his book Préludes, Minstrels. It was described at "reactive music" due to its nature of playing the short clips after certain actions.

Untitled Goose Game received positive reviews, with critics praising its gameplay and humor, and was named the D.I.C.E. Game of the Year, among other accolades. Dan Golding was nominated for an ARIA award for the music. By the end of 2019, it had sold more than a million copies.

Gameplay

Set in an idyllic English village, players control a domestic goose that can honk, duck down, run, flap its wings, and grab objects with its beak to bother various human villagers. The village is split up into multiple areas, each of which has a "to do" list of objectives, such as stealing certain objects or tricking humans into doing specific things. When enough of these objectives are cleared (one fewer than the total), an additional objective is added which, once cleared, allows the goose to move on to the next area. After completing four areas, the goose enters a miniature model of the village. There, the goose steals a golden bell before going back through the previous areas while the villagers try to stop it. 

The goose deposits the bell into a ditch full of several other bells it has stolen. There are several hidden optional objectives, many of which require traversing multiple areas or completing an area within a time limit. Completing all the optional objectives rewards the player with a crown for the goose to wear.

A co-operative local multiplayer option, added in a later update, allows a second player to control a Chinese goose, with both geese trying to accomplish the goals together.

Development and release
Untitled Goose Game was developed by four-person indie studio House House, based in Melbourne, Australia. The game originated from a stock photograph of a goose that an employee posted in the company's internal communications, which sparked a conversation about geese. The team put the idea aside for a few months until they realised that it had the potential to be a fun game. Untitled Goose Game was published by Panic for macOS, Nintendo Switch, and Windows on 20 September 2019. The game is House House's second project, and like their debut, was supported by the government organization Film Victoria, who assisted the studio in getting set up properly.

House House cited Super Mario 64 as the initial inspiration for the type of game that they hoped to build. They wanted the player to control a character who could run around in a 3D environment. Their previous game, Push Me Pull You, had 2D art with flat colours. They used a similar aesthetic in Untitled Goose Game by choosing to use low poly meshes, flat colours and untextured 3D models.

The game's playable character, the goose, was originally just a stock image and the idea was non-player characters (NPCs) would react to it. They implemented a system where the NPCs would tidy up after an item was moved. After restricting the field of view of the NPCs, the gameplay evolved into a unique stealth-like experience. Instead of remaining hidden like in most stealth games, the goal was to have the goose attract the attention of NPCs and not get caught. House House created a structure using missions with specific targets similar to the assassinations in the Hitman series mostly as a joke. House House member Jake Strasser stated "It has a set-up and a punchline. By removing the violence from it, we just let the situations exist as a joke." The team opted for the English village as the setting, as its "properness" was seen as "the antithesis of what the goose was all about", according to developer Nico Disseldorp. Developer Michael McMaster also stated that, "A major influence for the game was children’s TV programming from the UK... Postman Pat, Fireman Sam, Brum, etc. This is probably where the “storybook” feeling comes from..." The name of Untitled Goose Game was a result of having to come up with a title quickly on learning that the game had been accepted at the Fantastic Arcade part of the Fantastic Fest in Texas, and without any other ideas, used the title of the gameplay video they had applied with for the submission, which stuck since then. The Untitled Goose Game title stuck with fans when they started to promote the game on social media. The only other title they had come up with at one point was Some Like it Honk as an alternative, but the team never gave it serious consideration.

Music
The trailer, scored by composer Dan Golding, features musical passages from the twelfth prelude in Claude Debussy's Préludes, Minstrels. Comments on the trailer praised the apparent "reactive music" system where the music stopped and started depending on the action in the game, though House House said later this was a misconception, as the stops and starts were actually part of Debussy's composition. The positive reception to the trailer's music led House House to include Debussy's work as part of the soundtrack, and to actually develop a "reactive music" system for the game. To accomplish this, Golding sliced two versions of the piano tracks — one performed normally, and the other performed quietly — up into roughly 400 sections. These sections were categorised based on intensity, and played based on what was happening. For example, the game would play a section of the quieter version of Minstrels when the goose was stalking its prey, but switch to the regular version once the goose was being chased.

An official soundtrack was digitally released by Decca Records on 27 March 2020. It features both the regular and quiet versions of each track, as well as two original ones, called "Waltz For House House", which plays on the menu in the PlayStation 4 version of Untitled Goose Game, and "Untitled Goose Radio", which includes every track played from the in-game radio. A portion of the score was also released on vinyl by iam8bit, which was pressed with double grooves to emulate the randomness of the in-game music.

Release

The game was revealed in October 2017 with a trailer. The trailer gained viral popularity on social media sites, leading the team to recognise they had a popular concept on which to build.

Following the initial trailer's release, Untitled Goose Game was present at the Game Developers Conference, PAX Australia, and PAX West (Prime) events in 2018. At E3 2019, the game was announced for PC on the Epic Games Store. House House elaborated on their decision, stating that Epic's offer of an exclusivity deal allowed the developers the stability to go from part-time to full-time developers. The development team has stated that they are investigating porting the game to additional platforms, including mobile devices. PlayStation 4 and Xbox One versions were released on 17 December 2019. The Xbox One version was included as a part of the Xbox Game Pass service. Physical releases for the PlayStation 4 and Nintendo Switch versions were produced by iam8bit and released on 29 September 2020. iam8bit also published the game's soundtrack on vinyl record for release the same day.

A free update on 23 September 2020 added a co-operative multiplayer mode for two players. This update was launched alongside the game's release on the Steam and itch.io storefronts.

Reception

Untitled Goose Game received "generally favorable" reviews according to review aggregator Metacritic.

IGN gave the game an 8/10 rating and praised its silliness, stating, "Untitled Goose Game is a brief but endlessly charming adventure that had me laughing, smiling, and eagerly honking the whole way through." Game Informer praised the game for its silliness and creativity, but felt that the game was shallow and repetitive, stating, "Untitled Goose Game is a great concept, and ends in the same charming way it started ... Most people will play it for the silly premise, complete it in a few hours, and go on their merry way without touching it again." Destructoid positively compared the game to Shaun the Sheep, stating, "Untitled Goose Game reminds me greatly of the animated series Shaun the Sheep. There's little dialog, plenty of antics, and humans who keep getting outsmarted by birds..." Kotaku gave the game a positive review, praising the gameplay and the understated humor of its "brief, endlessly funny interactions", and finding "an insidious joy in drawing out increasingly infuriated reactions from the small town's people".

Untitled Goose Game drew similar attention as Goat Simulator, both sharing the nature of being animal-based sandbox-style games to create chaos in. After release, clips and stills from the game were shared on social media, with it becoming an Internet meme.

Sales
More than 100,000 copies were sold within its first two weeks of release on the Nintendo Switch. It was noted for having topped the Nintendo Switch sales charts in Australia, the United Kingdom, and the United States, even above the mainline Nintendo game released on the same day, The Legend of Zelda: Link's Awakening. By the end of 2019, it had sold over a million copies across all platforms.

As part of a nationwide "Pay the Rent" campaign to provide reparations to the Indigenous Australians whose land had been taken from them by British colonisation, House House said it will donate 1% of their income to Indigenous groups, as their studio occupies "stolen Wurundjeri land". The end credits of the game contain the line "This game was made on the lands of the Wurundjeri people of the Kulin Nation. We pay our respects to their Elders, past and present. Sovereignty was never ceded."

Awards

References

External links

2019 video games
AIAS Game of the Year winners
Cooperative video games
Indie video games
Internet memes introduced in 2019
MacOS games
Nintendo Switch games
PlayStation 4 games
Puzzle video games
Multiplayer and single-player video games
Stealth video games
Video game memes
Video games about birds
Video games developed in Australia
Video games set in England
Video games with cel-shaded animation
Windows games
Xbox One games
Game Developers Choice Award for Game of the Year winners
BAFTA winners (video games)